Frances Wynne (1863 – August 1893) was a 19th-century Irish poet.

Frances Wynne was born in 1863 in Collon, a village near Drogheda, County Louth. She was educated privately and at Alexandra College, Dublin. She started writing poetry at a young age. Through Katharine Tynan she made the acquaintance of Matthew Russell, editor of the Irish Monthly, who was impressed with her writing and published her poems in the magazine. She went on to contribute to Longman's Magazine,  The Providence Journal and The Spectator. Matthew Russell offered to pay for the publication of her poems, and a collection, called Whisper!, was published by Messrs. Kegan Paul in 1891. It was very well received by the critics.

She married her second cousin, Rev. Henry Wynne, who was provided with a parish in London. She died there after giving birth to their first child in August 1893.

Shortly after her death, Katherine Tynan wrote the elegy "A Young Mother" in her memory.

References

1863 births
1893 deaths
People from County Louth
Irish women poets
19th-century Irish poets
19th-century Irish women writers
19th-century Irish writers